Per Felix Sandström (born 12 January 1997) is a Swedish professional ice hockey goaltender for the  Philadelphia Flyers of the National Hockey League (NHL). Sandström was selected by the Flyers in the third round (70th overall) of the 2015 NHL Entry Draft.

Playing career
Sandström made his Swedish Hockey League (SHL) debut playing with Brynäs IF during the 2014–15 SHL season. Following the 2016–17 season, Sandström opted to continue his development with Brynäs IF, accepting a one-year contract extension on 10 May 2017.

In the 2017–18 season, Sandström was unable to cement a full-time role within Brynäs IF, and after appearing in only eight games with the club, was transferred to fellow SHL outfit HV71 on 12 February 2018.

Sandström signed a three-year, entry-level contract with the Philadelphia Flyers on 27 March 2018. He then joined AHL affiliate, the Lehigh Valley Phantoms on a professional try-out basis for their postseason on 31 March 2018. On 8 June 2021, Sandström signed a one-year, two-way contract extension with the Flyers. For the 2022-23 NHL season, he was promoted to become the Flyers backup goalie behind Carter Hart, making him a full-time NHL goalie for the first time in his career.

Personal life
Sandström's twin brother, Simon, also played with Brynäs IF at the J20 SuperElit level before leaving to play in the Hockeyettan with IF Sundsvall Hockey.

Career statistics

Regular season and playoffs

International

References

External links
 

1997 births
Brynäs IF players
HV71 players
IK Oskarshamn players
Lehigh Valley Phantoms players
Living people
People from Gävle
Philadelphia Flyers draft picks
Philadelphia Flyers players
Reading Royals players
Swedish ice hockey goaltenders
Sportspeople from Gävleborg County
Västerviks IK players